"The Carpenter" is a song written by Guy Clark and released on his 1983 album, Better Days. It was covered by American country music artist John Conlee in September 1986 as the third single from his album Harmony. The song reached #6 on the Billboard Hot Country Singles chart in January 1987 and #1 on the RPM Country Tracks chart in Canada.

Chart performance

References

1986 singles
1983 songs
John Conlee songs
Songs written by Guy Clark
Columbia Records singles